Navy Command may refer to:
Navy Command (Germany)
Navy Command (Royal Navy), UK
Tanzania Naval Command